Among Brothers is a World album released in 2003 by Algerian composer and singer-songwriter Abderrahmane Abdelli. The album was released by Real World Records.

Track listing
 "Amazine Introduction" – 1:34
 "Amazine (Moonlight)" – 6:01
 "Itij Introduction" – 1:14
 "Itij (The Sun)" – 6:46
 "Kif-kif (Either Way)" – 3:15
 "Asiram (Hope)" – 4:30
 "Svar (Patience)" – 4:09
 "Adhou Introduction" – 1:56
 "Adhou (The Wind)" – 1:44
 "Inas (The Message)" – 6:53
 "Tharguith (The Dream)" – 5:21
 "Ayen (Why?)" – 4:36
 "Ayema-yema (O My Mother)" – 6:43
 "Thamziw Introduction" – 3:06
 "Thamziw (My Youth)" – 3:04

Personnel
THE MUSICIANS
Abdelli (Algeria) - lead vocal; mandola
Thierry Van Roy (Belgium) - e-bow guitars; keyboards
Assedine Jazouli (Morocco) - darbukka; bendir; taarija; bells; tabla; tar (percussion); daf; karkabou
Abdelmagid 'Mgidou' Makrai Lamanti (Morocco) - violin; percussion
Said 'El Asfour' Mohammed Najib (Tunisia) - nay
Luis Leiva Alquinta (Chile) - bombo; cajon; bells; Maracas; udu; guiro; reco-reco; triangle
Carlos Diaz (Argentina) - Spanish guitar
Lahcen Bourgha (Morocco) - ajouj; wooden karkabou

In Cape Verde:
Ulysses Santos - lead acoustic guitar; Portuguese guitar; cavaquino
Aurelio Santos - cavaquino
Bitori - diatonic accordion
Totovares - acoustic guitar
Halder - ferrinio
Aderito - additional guitar

In Azerbaijan:
Möhlet Müslümov - târ
Fahraddin Dadashov - kemantcha
Faïg Alibalayev - garmon
Elshad Jabbarov - balaban; clarinet; flute
Malahat Aliyeva - kanun
Farhad Rahimov - nagara; zarb
Oktaj - gosha nagara
Jawad Smaili - Iranian nay

In Burkina Faso:
The drum section of Farafina
Salif Koné - bara
Adolphe Kinda - djembe
Bakhari Traoré - bara
Souleymane 'Mani' Sanou - doumdouba; shekere

References

External links
 Among Brothers on Abdelli's official site
 Among Brothers on RealWorldRecords.com

Abderrahmane Abdelli albums
2003 albums
Among Brothers